Erik Palladino (born May 10, 1968) is an American actor known for his portrayal of Dr. Dave Malucci in the NBC medical drama ER. He is also known for his recurring roles as Lt. Michael Daghlian in Joan of Arcadia,  Vostanik Sabatino in NCIS: Los Angeles and Kevin Miller on Suits. He has also had major supporting roles in the films Buried, Latter Days and U-571.

Early life
Palladino was born the youngest of three boys in Yonkers, New York, in the spring of 1968 to an Armenian mother, Queenie, a high school teacher, and Peter Palladino, a heating contractor of Italian descent. His older brothers are Chris (b. 1961) and Todd (b. 1963).

Career
Palladino has been in over 20 feature films. He is also known for his work in television on shows such as Law & Order: Special Victims Unit, CSI: Crime Scene Investigation, Fringe, Burn Notice, NCIS and NCIS: Los Angeles. 
He has starred in movies U-571 alongside Matthew McConaughey and Harvey Keitel, Finders Fee opposite James Earl Jones, the teen comedy Can't Hardly Wait and TV series Suits as Kevin Miller.

In 1999, Palladino landed his breakthrough starring role, one month after returning from the U-571 shoot in Rome, on ER as Dr. Dave Malucci, which he played in the sixth season until the eighth season in 2001. In 2005, he starred in the FX war drama Over There as Sgt. Scream, the leader of a squad of U.S. 3rd Infantry Division soldiers involved in the 2003 Invasion of Iraq.

He is a singer of the rock band Hearing Red. Palladino was also the host of the short-lived TV series, Hit Parader's Heavy Metal Meltdown, in the late '80s.

Filmography

Film

Television

References

External links
 
 World Poker Tour profile

1968 births
Living people
American people of Armenian descent
Male actors from New York (state)
American people of Italian descent
American male film actors
American male television actors
People from Yonkers, New York
20th-century American male actors
21st-century American male actors